FC Rohožník is a Slovak football team, based in the town of Rohožník.  It currently plays in Slovak 2. liga, the second tier of Slovak football.

Honours
 Slovak third division (Group Bratislava) (1993–)
  Winners (1): 2020–21

Colours
Club colours are red, yellow and blue.

Current squad
As of 30 September, 2021.

For recent transfers, see List of Slovak football transfers winter 2021–22.

External links
Official website 
Futbalnet profile

References

Football clubs in Slovakia
Association football clubs established in 1919